The 2015 Sana'a mosque bombings were four suicide attacks on 20 March 2015 in Sana'a, Yemen.

The attack 
The al-Badr and al-Hashoosh mosques came under suicide attack during midday prayers. The blasts killed 142 people and wounded more than 351, making it the deadliest terrorist attack in Yemen's history. One suicide bomber blew up outside the gate of al-Badr mosque when he was caught by militia guards, and the second detonated his device among fleeing people inside the mosque. Another pair of bombers blew up at Al-Hashoosh mosque.

The targeted mosques are linked to the Houthis, a group of the Zaidiyyah sect of Shia Islam. The Houthis deposed the Yemeni government earlier in 2015 after they took control of Sana'a the previous year.

Responsibility 
The Islamic State of Iraq and the Levant (ISIL) Yemen branch claimed responsibility for the attack. In a recording released by the group, they stated: "IS soldiers will not rest until they stop the Safawi [Iranian] operation in Yemen.”

According to Bruce Riedel of the Brookings Institution, the bombings were more likely carried out by al-Qaeda in the Arabian Peninsula (AQAP). AQAP denied this, citing instructions from Ayman al-Zawahiri to not attack mosques or markets. If ISIL was responsible, these would be the first attacks it has carried out in Yemen.

Reactions 
The U.S. Department of State called for a stop to any military actions, to be followed by a diplomatic solution. Ban Ki-moon, the United Nations Secretary General, demanded that all sides "immediately cease all hostile actions and exercise maximum restraint."

On 23 March, an Iranian Airbus 310 of Mahan Air loaded with 13-ton package of humanitarian aids as well as aid workers of Iranian Red Crescent landed at Sanaa. On its departure from Yemen, 52 wounded people of the bombings were transferred to Tehran to receive treatment. Iran's deputy ambassador Rasai Ebadi said more aid would come soon.

See also 
 2012 Sana'a bombing
 2013 Sana'a attack
 January 2015 Sana'a bombing
 Persecution of Shias by the Islamic State

References 

2015 murders in Yemen
Suicide bombings in 2015
Mass murder in 2015
21st century in Sanaa
Islamic terrorist incidents in 2015
Suicide bombings in Yemen
ISIL terrorist incidents in Yemen
Terrorist incidents in Yemen in 2015
March 2015 crimes in Asia
March 2015 events in Asia
Attacks on Shiite mosques
Mosque bombings by Islamists
Yemeni Civil War crimes